The Philippines lies along the Pacific Ring of Fire, which causes the country to have frequent seismic and volcanic activity. Many earthquakes of smaller magnitude occur very regularly due to the meeting of major tectonic plates in the region.

Spanish period 
Earthquakes recorded from the 17th to 19th century:

17th century

18th century

19th century

American period and post–World War II (1900-1999)

20th century

Mid to Late 20th century

21st century

Largest earthquakes by year

The largest or most notable Philippine earthquakes per year since 2001. As for the repeated entries, Moro Gulf near the Cotabato Trench is a seismically active area (the location of the devastating 1918 Celebes Sea earthquake and 1976 Moro Gulf earthquake). Meanwhile, Samar and Davao Region are near the northern and southern portions of the Philippine Trench, respectively.

2001–present
 Only earthquakes of magnitude 7.0+ are included, unless the event is notable such as causing casualties, or significant damage.
 A magnitude 7.5 quake struck Mindanao on January 1, 2001, at a depth of 33 km.
 A magnitude 7.5 quake struck Southern and Central Mindanao on March 5, 2002 at a depth of 31 km. At least 15 people were killed, 100 injured and 800 buildings were damaged or destroyed.
 A  magnitude 6.1 quake struck Sultan Kudarat on March 6, 2002. Office of Civil Defense (OCD) records show that 8 people had died and 41 were injured due to the earthquake.  It affected 7,684 families in the provinces of Sultan Kudarat, Sarangani, North Cotabato and South Cotabato including four cities and 17 municipalities.
 A magnitude 6.2 quake struck Masbate on February 15, 2003, at a depth of 22 km. The quake damaged major infrastructures in Masbate.
 A magnitude 6.5 quake struck Can-avid, Eastern Samar on November 18, 2003. A five-year old child died, crushed by a falling wall, while 21 others, including his mother, suffered injuries. Many structures were  damaged or destroyed in various parts of the province, including a school. A landslide occurred in the town of Taft. Power outages occurred throughout Eastern Samar. 
 A magnitude 5.7 earthquake hit Sultan Kudarat on September 18, 2009. At least 91 people were injured and 76 houses, 2 commercial buildings, and a fence of a high school were damaged in the province as well in neighboring South Cotabato. In the town of Norala, two houses were totally destroyed.
 A series of quakes with the main quake's magnitude 7.3 struck Moro Gulf on July 23–24, 2010.
 A magnitude 5.2 quake struck Valencia City, Bukidnon on November 8, 2011, at a depth of 1 km. 39 people were injured, and several establishments were damaged.
 A magnitude  6.9 quake struck Negros, the rest of Central Visayas, and some parts of Mindanao on February 6, 2012, at a depth of 20 km. The quake killed people, caused major damage on infrastructures, and buildings. A tsunami alert level 2 was raised due to the quake. The quake also caused a landslide, burying a barangay. More than a thousand of aftershocks were recorded by PHIVOLCS within 2 days since the quake occurred. According to National Disaster Risk Reduction and Management Council, as of February 18, 2012, the death toll have risen to 51 with 62 people still missing, and injuring 112 people. Most deaths came from the city of Guihulngan and La Libertad where landslides occurred. 63, 697 from provinces in Region VII were affected by the quake. 15, 483 houses were partially or totally damaged, and a total of ₱383-million worth of damage to buildings, roads and bridges, and other infrastructures were recorded.
 A magnitude  5.9 quake struck Surigao City on March 16, 2012. Many were injured in the city for that certain day was the grand opening of Gaisano Capital Surigao. An estimated 6,000 people were in Gaisano when the earthquake happened. The earthquake caused a stampede which injured people.
 A magnitude of 7.6 quake struck 106 km near Guiuan, Eastern Samar on August 31, 2012. It was also felt in certain areas of Visayas and Mindanao. One person died, and another one was injured in Cagayan de Oro after being trapped in a collapsed house due to a landslide. Minutes after the quake, power interruptions occurred in the affected areas. The National Disaster Risk Reduction and Management Council reported that a house in Agusan del Sur province caught fire sparked by a gas lamp that was toppled during the earthquake. It also reported that two bridges in Eastern Samar, particularly the Buyayawan Bridge in Mercedes town and the Barangay Casuroy Bridge in San Julian town, were partially damaged. The Abreeza Mall in Bajada, Davao City suffered minor cracks on the floor due to the earthquake. In General MacArthur, Eastern Samar, 77 homes were damaged. There were also 6 houses damaged in Barangay Casoroy, San Julian. In Balangiga, Eastern Samar, a hospital sustained serious damage. A wall from an old building collapsed in Butuan. The NDRRMC reported on Saturday noon there were cracks on some roads and bridges and other establishments in areas where the quake was felt. Most of the homes destroyed were those made of light materials, while overall damage to infrastructure remained minimal. A tsunami warning of Level 3 was raised by the Philippine Institute of Volcanology and Seismology, but was lifted 5 hours after the quake only caused tiny waves.
 A series of earthquakes, struck cities of Malaybalay and Valencia, and the sitio of Musuan, Maramag in Bukidnon last September 3–4, 2012. The first quake has a magnitude of 3.4 and was felt at 06:48 pm, and was followed by magnitude 4.0 at 07:45 pm, and 4.7 at 09:21 pm. Hours after the first three, a series of quakes occurred in 03:44 am and in 03:52 am. The first quake had a magnitude of 5.6 with a depth of focus of 3 km; while the second one was recorded at a magnitude of 4.9 with a depth focus of 3 km. The quake was felt as far as Cagayan de Oro, Kidapawan, Butuan, and Cotabato cities. A nun was injured in Barangay Lourdes in Valencia City after the incident. Valencia City Disaster Risk Reduction and Management Council reported that 144 houses and structures were destroyed. Mayor Ignacio Zubiri of Malaybalay City reported no casualties nor damage in his city. The quakes were of tectonic in origin. A total of 131 aftershocks were recorded after the 5.6 quake on September 4, 2012.
 A 5.7 earthquake struck the island of Mindanao on June 1, 2013. The quake's epicenter was located in Carmen, Cotabato and struck with a depth of 5 kilometers. The said quake injured six people, 4 of them were children, and fully or partly destroyed several houses, and some school buildings. It also damaged a bridge at Barangay Kimadzil, and another one at Barangay Kibudtungan. The quake was followed by 15 aftershocks, the last one was followed by a 4.3 quake on June 2, 2013. The quake caused ₱71-million worth of damage. Another quake jolted the said town after 4:00 am on June 3, 2013. The quake was recorded at 5.7 and struck at a depth of 3 kilometers. The newest quake further injured 8 more people, and damaged more houses. Classes which was slated to open on June 3, 2013, were cancelled due to a series of quakes that hit the town since June 1, 2013.
 A magnitude of 7.2 earthquake struck Bohol on October 15, 2013, at 8:12 a.m. (PST). According to the official report by the National Disaster Risk Reduction and Management Council, 222 were reported dead while 796 people were injured. Tens of thousands of structures were damaged by the earthquake. Most notable were the national historical churches in Bohol and Cebu.

 A magnitude 6.1 quake struck 47 km N 47°E of Burgos (Surigao del Norte) on July 3, 2015, 2:43 pm at a depth of 26 km. One person died of a heart attack in Balingasag and minor damage was observed in Del Carmen, Surigao del Norte.
 A magnitude 6.5 earthquake struck 10 km SW of Basilisa, Dinagat Islands on February 10, 2017, 10:03 pm at a depth of 15 km. Eight people were killed and 202 injured.
 Batangas experienced an earthquake swarm in April 2017. A magnitude 5.5 earthquake struck 5 km W of Batangas on April 4, 2017, 8:58 pm at a depth of 82 km. Twin earthquakes with magnitudes of 5.6 and 6.0 hit the barangays of Bagalangit and Tanauan, both in Mabini, Batangas respectively on April 8, 2017, 3:07 and 3:09 pm at a depth of 40.4 km. Damages on some buildings and houses have been reported. Several aftershocks followed.
 A magnitude 6.9 earthquake struck 47 km S 26° W of Sarangani and Davao Occidental provinces on April 29, 2017, at 4:23 am at a depth of 57 km. Five people were injured.
 A magnitude 6.5 earthquake struck 3 km S 16° E of Jaro, Leyte on July 6, 2017, at 4:03 pm at a depth of 8 km. It caused island-wide blackouts in the provinces of Samar, Bohol, Leyte, and parts of Southern Leyte In Kananga, a commercial building collapsed killing two persons and injuring 20 others. In Ormoc City, a landslide was triggered. Four people died and 100 others were injured.
A magnitude 6.1 earthquake struck Central Luzon (with epicenter in Castillejos, Zambales) on April 22, 2019, at 5:11 pm. Widespread damage was also caused in Pampanga Province, 18 people were killed and 282 others injured.
A magnitude 6.4 earthquake struck Eastern Visayas (Eastern Samar) on April 23, 2019, at 1:37 pm. 48 people were injured, most of them slightly by falling objects.
A magnitude 5.6 earthquake struck Makilala, Cotabato on July 9, 2019, at 8:36 pm local time, leaving 1 dead and 73 injured.
A twin magnitude 5.4 and 5.9 earthquake struck off east of Itbayat, Batanes on July 27, 2019. The first tremor occurred at 4:16 am at a depth of 12 km and the second tremor occurred at 7:37 am at a depth of 21 km. The twin quakes destroyed several structures in Itbayat. 9 people were confirmed dead while 60 people are injured.
A magnitude of 6.3 earthquake struck Tulunan, Cotabato on October 16, 2019, around 7:37 pm. Seven people were reported dead and more than 200 others injured. Most of the houses in Brgy. Malawanit Magsaysay, Davao del Sur, were destroyed. The aftermath left frequent aftershocks extended to over a week on random cycles.
A magnitude of 6.6 earthquake again struck in Tulunan, Cotabato on October 29, 2019, with some reports stating that this earthquake felt much devastating as the previous earthquake that took place on October 16, 2019. Nearby towns such as those in Kidapawan, North Cotabato and Davao city were also affected. 
A magnitude 6.5 earthquake struck Tulunan, Cotabato for the third time on October 31, 2019, Death toll amongst towns and cities nearby has increased; CNN Philippines reporting increased fatal casualties risen to 10 during live news broadcast. Revised body count reports 24 fatal casualties in total including the numbers from the two consecutive earthquakes that took place on October 29 and 31, with more than 500 people being injured and three reported missing.
A magnitude 6.8 earthquake struck Matanao, Davao del Sur on  December 15, 2019, at 2:11 pm. 13 people were killed, one remains missing and 210 others were injured during this tremor.

 A magnitude 6.6 earthquake struck Cataingan, Masbate on August 18, 2020, at 8:03 am. Two people were killed and at least 170 people were injured.
A magnitude 6.1 earthquake struck Magsaysay, Davao del Sur on February 7, 2021, at 12:22 pm. 14 people were injured after the earthquake.
 A magnitude 6.6 earthquake struck off the coast of Calatagan, Batangas on July 24, 2021, at 4:49 a.m. (PhST). A 5.5 magnitude aftershock struck off the same area shortly afterward. PHIVOLCS also reported several aftershocks with magnitudes ranging from 1.7 to 3 hours later. The earthquake caused a landslide in Calatagan and damaged houses in Lubang, Occidental Mindoro.
 A magnitude 7.1 earthquake struck off the coast of Governor Generoso, Davao Oriental on August 12, 2021, at 1:46 a.m. (PhsT). PHIVOLCS reported earlier that the epicenter was located off the coast of Mati City in Davao Oriental, with a 7.3 magnitude. No major damages reported so far. A 20-year-old man died after being hit by falling coconuts in Tandag City, Surigao del Sur.
 A magnitude 7.0 earthquake struck the province of Abra in the Cordillera Administrative Region on July 27, 2022. PHIVOLCS reported the epicenter at 17.64°N, 120.63°E - 003 km N 45° W of Tayum (Abra) at a depth of 17 kilometers. Tremors were felt in Northern and Central Luzon including Metro Manila and adjacent provinces.
 A magnitude 6.0 earthquake struck the province of Davao de Oro in the Davao Region on February 1, 2023. PHIVOLCS reported the epicenter at 7.66°N, 126.07°E - 002 km S 66° W of New Bataan (Davao de Oro) at a depth of 17 kilometers. Sixteen people were injured and 52 buildings were damaged.

Deadliest earthquakes

See also

Geology of the Philippines

References

External links

 Official website of the Philippine Institute of Volcanology and Seismology 
 Latest Earthquake Bulletin in the Philippines
 Official website of the National Disaster Risk Reduction and Management Council

 Link
Philippines
Earthquakes